James Ashton (4 April 1859 – 2 August 1935) was an artist and arts educator in South Australia.

Early life
Ashton was born on the Isle of Man, grew up in York and was educated at the Blue Coat School, London. After being apprenticed to a pharmacist, he studied art at the South Kensington School of Art, London and at Paris. He married Mary Elizabeth Rawlings Turnbull on 27 December 1880.

Career

Ashton emigrated to Adelaide, arriving 11 January 1884 deciding to become a professional artist. He established the Norwood art school in 1886. He visited England in 1894, studied under Henry Moore, R.A. for three months, and was elected a member of the Royal Society of Arts. Returning to Adelaide in 1895 he founded the Academy of Arts in Victoria Buildings, Victoria Square, and for over 30 years was the best known teacher of painting in South Australia. Among his pupils were Ivor Hele, Hans Heysen, Hayley Lever, Frank White, Arthur Baker-Clack, his son Will Ashton, and others who have since done distinguished work. He was an art teacher at Prince Alfred College for nearly 40 years, and donated his art collection and library to the school. He was president of the South Australian Society of Arts for four years and a founding member and longtime president of the Adelaide Easel Club.

Personal life
He died at Adelaide on 2 August 1935 of intestinal obstruction due to hernia. He was survived by his wife and a son and a daughter.

His son, Sir John William Ashton, became a well-known artist and was appointed director of the Art Gallery of New South Wales, Sydney in 1936.

Works
Ashton is represented by five pictures in the Art Gallery of South Australia, of which The Moon Enchanted Sea is the best known. Paintings by him are also in the Broken Hill, Bendigo, and other galleries. 

Works held by the Art Gallery of South Australia are:
Where reeds and rushes grow c.1899
Sunset on the gulf 1900
The moon enchanted sea 1910
Sand dunes c.1916

References

1859 births
1935 deaths
Alumni of the Royal College of Art
English emigrants to colonial Australia
19th-century Australian painters
19th-century Australian male artists
20th-century Australian painters
20th-century Australian male artists
Australian male painters